Yoan Pablo Hernández Suárez (born October 28, 1984) is a Cuban-German professional boxer. He is a former unified cruiserweight world champion, having held the IBF and Ring magazine titles between 2011 and 2015, as well as the WBA interim cruiserweight title in 2011. He is the half-brother of Yoel Romero, a freestyle wrestler and mixed martial artist.

Amateur career 
Yoan Pablo Hernández started boxing with the Cuban national team at a very young age. He got silver at the Cadet World Championships (under 17) 2001 at 201 lbs/91 kg. He won the heavyweight Junior World Championships in 2002 in Santiago de Cuba but lost twice to countryman Odlanier Solís and was forced to go down in weight. At light heavyweight (178 lbs) in 2003 Hernández won the silver medal at the Pan American Games in Santo Domingo where he lost to Ramiro Reducindo.

He participated in the 2004 Summer Olympics for his native country. There he was defeated in the second round of the light heavyweight (81 kg) division by Russia's Evgeny Makarenko, a double world champion in the event.

Although he was considered one of the top prospects in Cuban boxing, he defected to Germany, and is now based in Berlin, Germany.

Amateur highlights 
2001 Cuban junior champion at heavyweight
World Junior championships as a heavyweight, in competition in Baku, Azerbaijan. Results were:
Defeated Dato Dundva (Georgia) points
Defeated Rufat Hairbekov (Azerbaijan) points
Lost to Siergej Ivanov (Russia) points
World Junior championships 2002 (heavyweight) in Santiago de Cuba, Cuba. Results were:
Defeated Justin White (Canada) RTD 1
Defeated Vitaly Mikhyeyenko (Ukraine) 31–11.
Defeated Stefan Koeber (Germany) RSC 3
Defeated Parfait Amougou (Cameroon) RSC 3. (Captured gold medal)
Pan American games 2003 (light heavyweight) in Santo Domingo, Dominican Republic
Defeated Argenis Casimiro Núñez (Dominican Republic) RSC 4
Lost to Ramiro Reducindo (Mexico (20–37) (won silver medal)
Represented Cuba as a light heavyweight at the 2004 Athens Olympic Games. His results were:
1st round bye:
Lost to Evgeny Makarenko (Russia) 18–30
2003 knocked out by Odlanier Solís in 3rd round at Cuban amateur heavyweight championship competition.
2003 competed as a light heavyweight at 2003 Pan-American Games in Santo Domingo, Dominican Republic. Results were:
Defeated Eduardo Beltran (Ecuador) RSC 1
Defeated Argenis Casimiro Núñez (Dominican Republic) RSC 4
Lost to Ramiro Reducindo (Mexico) 20–37
2004 3rd place at Cuban national light heavyweight competition, losing on points to Vladimir Linares Mesquia RSC 4
2005 Cuban national champion (light heavyweight)

Professional career

Cruiserweight 
Hernández was a fast and hard-punching boxer who competed entirely at cruiserweight. Hernández knocked out Daniel Bispo in the first round to win the vacant WBA Fedelatin Cruiserweight Championship. On December 29, 2007, he knocked out world title challenger Mohamed Azzaoui to retain his WBA Fedelatin title and win the vacant WBC Latino title but suffered his first defeat on March 29, 2008 when he lost via 3rd-round TKO to ex-champ Wayne Braithwaite of Guyana after controlling the match for the first two rounds and even knocking Braithwaite down in the 1st round. Hernández got too cocky in the 3rd and decided to shoot it out with him resulting in Braithwaite knocking Hernández down 3 times. He later won a wide decision over prospect Aaron Williams.

On September 19, 2009 Hernández defeated Enad Licina by a wide UD for the IBF Inter-Continental Cruiserweight title, becoming the first Cuban to hold a version of the IBF title since it was created.

On March 13, 2010 Hernández made his first defense of the IBF Inter-Continental title by beating Cesar David Crenz by unanimous decision.

On February 12, 2011 Hernández won the Interim WBA Cruiserweight title by knocking out Steve Herelius. With this latest win he extended his undefeated streak to 10 fights since the defeat to Braithwaite and improved his overall record to 24-1 (13 knockouts).

Hernández vs. Cunningham I & II 
On 1 October 2011, Hernández defeated The Ring No. 1 Cruiserweight, Steve Cunningham, by sixth round technical decision for the IBF Cruiserweight Championship. The fight was stopped due to Hernández being cut by an illegal headbutt, though the fight was not without controversy. Hernández knocked Cunningham down with a counter left hook in the first round and seemed to be badly hurt, but referee Mickey Vann decided to let the fight continue after what seemed like a controversial slow count. Cunningham made a comeback during the second and third rounds, hitting Hernández with body shots in the second and becoming more aggressive during the third. However the latter round was also marred with controversy as Hernández was hit with an accidental headbutt that caused a cut and that many felt was intentional, with referee Vann not stopping the fight or even giving a warning to Cunningham. During the fourth round both fighters seems about equal, with Cunningham controlling the pace with his jab and Hernández successfully landing a combo. During the fifth round, Hernández accidentally hit Cunningham behind the head when referee Vann attempted to break up a clinch. During the sixth and final round the corner of Hernández as well as the ringside physician inspected the cut caused by Cunningham's headbutt. Afterwards Hernández seemed ready to resume with the round when the referee stopped the fight due to the physician deeming Hernández unfit to continue. The score cards were 57–56 for Cunningham and 58–55 and 59–54 for Hernández.

Hernández and Cunningham had a rematch on 4 February 2012. The winner of this fight was to be crowned the new The Ring Cruiserweight Champion. Hernández won via unanimous decision.

Outside boxing
Hernández played the part of Joe Louis in the 2010 German film Max Schmeling.

Professional boxing record

References

External links

1984 births
Living people
Light-heavyweight boxers
International Boxing Federation champions
Cuban emigrants to Germany
Naturalized citizens of Germany
Boxers at the 2003 Pan American Games
Boxers at the 2004 Summer Olympics
Olympic boxers of Cuba
Cuban male boxers
Pan American Games silver medalists for Cuba
The Ring (magazine) champions
World cruiserweight boxing champions
Heavyweight boxers
Pan American Games medalists in boxing
Medalists at the 2003 Pan American Games
People from Pinar del Río